Studentessi is a 2008 studio album by Italian rock band Elio e le Storie Tese.

Track listing
"Studentessi" – 0:46
"Plafone" (feat. Antonella Ruggiero) – 5:00
"Ignudi fra i nudisti" (feat. Giorgia) – 4:34
"Tristezza" – 4:32
"Effetto memoria [Inverno]"– 1:01
"Heavy Samba" (feat. Irene Grandi) – 6:51
"Gargaroz" – 5:45
"Suicidio a sorpresa: Allegro" (feat. Paola Cortellesi) – 1:27
"Suicidio a sorpresa: Allegretto" (feat. Paola Cortellesi) – 1:01
"Suicidio a sorpresa: Andante con moto" – 1:19
"Suicidio a sorpresa: Allegro" (feat. Paola Cortellesi) – 0:19
"Suicidio a sorpresa: Allegretto" (feat. Paola Cortellesi) – 1:52
"Effetto memoria [Primavera]" – 1:31
"La lega dell'amore" (feat. Claudio Bisio) – 4:26
"Indiani (A caval donando)" – 5:51
"Effetto memoria [Estate]" (feat. Claudio Baglioni) – 0:47
"Supermassiccio" – 5:52
"La risposta dell'architetto" – 4:43
"Parco sempione" – 4:58
"Il Congresso delle parti molli" – 7:04
"Single" (feat. Luigi Piloni [alias Feiez]) – 3:22
"Effetto memoria [Autunno]" (feat. Claudio Baglioni) – 5:49

Personnel

Elio e le Storie Tese
Elio – lead vocals, flute, acoustic guitar
Rocco Tanica – keyboards
Cesareo – electric guitar
Faso – bass guitar
Christian Meyer – drums
Jantoman (Uomo) – electronic keyboards

Additional musicians
Paolo Panigada (aka Feiez) – vocals in Single
Mangoni – vocals in La risposta dell'architetto
Demo Morselli – horns arrangement in: Tristezza, Parco Sempione, Suicidio a sorpresa, Ignudi fra i nudisti, Supermassiccio
Vittorio Cosma – keyboards in Il Congresso delle parti molli and spoken intro to some songs
Claudio Bisio – vocals in La lega dell'amore
Paola Cortellesi – vocals in Suicidio a sorpresa
Antonella Ruggiero – vocals in Plafone
Giorgia – vocals in Ignudi fra i nudisti
Irene Grandi – vocals in Heavy Samba
Claudio Baglioni – vocals in Effetto Memoria (estate) e Effetto Memoria (autunno)
Massimo Zagonari – saxophone and flute in Ignudi fra i nudisti, Tristezza e Parco Sempione
Ambrogio Frigerio – trombone in Ignudi fra i nudisti, Parco Sempione e Tristezza
Lucio Fabbri – violin in Indiani (A caval donando)
Remo Ceriotti – banjo in Indiani (A caval donando)
Paola Folli – vocals in Suicidio a sorpresa
Lola Feghaly – vocals in Suicidio a sorpresa

Charts

References

Further reading

External links

2008 albums
Elio e le Storie Tese albums
Italian-language albums